Reginald Pugh (12 July 1914 – 21 October 1981) was a Welsh professional footballer.

Career
Born in Aberaman, near Aberdare, Mid Glamorgan in July 1914, Pugh began his career at his hometown club Aberaman Athletic before joining Cardiff City shortly after. He made his debut in October 1934 in a 3–1 win over Watford, becoming one of the club's youngest ever debutants at the age of 17. The following season, he was ever present in a side that struggled to avoid relegation. Following the outbreak of World War II, he played several times for the club in wartime fixtures before serving in Burma with the South Wales Borderers. At the end of the hostilities, he did not return to professional football. Pugh died in Folkestone, Kent in October 1981 at the age of 67.

References

1914 births
1981 deaths
Aberaman Athletic F.C. players
Association football forwards
Brentford F.C. wartime guest players
British Army personnel of World War II
Cardiff City F.C. players
English Football League players
South Wales Borderers soldiers
Welsh footballers
Welsh military personnel